Ashwin Balrak (born 17 May 1975) is a Surinamese-Dutch professional kickboxer and lawyer.

Career and recent arrest
Balrak was a former WPKL European Kickboxing champion who also competed in K-1. He made his K-1 debut in 2007 at K-1 Fighting Network Romania 2007 against Patrice Quarteron.

A criminal lawyer by profession, Balrak was arrested on 26 November 2010 in Rotterdam along with five other Surinamese nationals for drug trafficking, carrying 82 kg of cocaine and allegedly trafficking drugs for a distribution network.

Titles
 Enfusion
 2014 Enfusion Reality Season 5 Tournament Champion
 TatNeft Arena
 2010 Tatneft Arena World Cup 2010  (+80 kg) runner-up
 2009 Tatneft Arena European Cup 2009 (+80 kg) champion
K-1
 2008 K-1 Prague tournament champion
 2007 K-1 Fighting Network Scandinavian Qualification runner up
Fights at the Border
 2005 Fights at the Border IV finalist
King of the Ring
 2005 King of the Ring world champion (-105 kg)
World Pro Kickboxing League
 2002 WPKL European Muaythai champion (-76 kg)
 2000 WPKL European Muaythai champion (-79.3 kg)

Kickboxing record

|-  style="background:#FFBBBB;"
| 2016-03-05 ||Loss ||align=left| Redouan Cairo || The Battle  || Netherlands || KO || 1 ||    
|-
|-  style="background:#FFBBBB;"
| 2015-02-01 || Loss ||align=left| Andrei Gerasimchuk || Kunlun Fight 18: The Return of the King - Super Heavyweight Tournament, Final 16 || Guangzhou, China || Decision (unanimous) || 3 || 3:00
|-
|-  style="background:#CCFFCC;"
| 2014-09-23 || Win ||align=left| Lukasz Krupadziorow || Enfusion 5: Victory of the Vixen, Final || Koh Samui, Thailand || TKO (Low Kicks) ||  || 
|-
! style=background:white colspan=9 |
|-
|-  style="background:#CCFFCC;"
| 2014-09-23 || Win ||align=left| Brice Guidon || Enfusion 5: Victory of the Vixen, Semi Finals || Koh Samui, Thailand || Decision || 3 || 3:00
|-
|-  style="background:#FFBBBB;"
| 2010-10-22 || Loss ||align=left| Vitali Akhramenko || Tatneft Arena World Cup 2010 final (+80 kg) || Kazan, Russia || Decision (unanimous) || 5 || 3:00
|-
! style=background:white colspan=9 |
|-
|-  style="background:#CCFFCC;"
| 2010-05-29|| Win ||align=left| Daniel Ghiţă || It's Showtime 2010 Amsterdam || Amsterdam, Netherlands || Decision (5-0) || 3 || 3:00
|-  style="background:#FFBBBB;"
| 2010-02-27|| Loss ||align=left| Hesdy Gerges || Amsterdam Fightclub presents: Amsterdam vs Rotterdam || Amsterdam, Netherlands || Decision (Unanimous) || 3 || 3:00
|-  style="background:#CCFFCC;"
| 2009-10-23 || Win ||align=left| Semen Shelepov || Tatneft Arena European Cup 2009 final (+80 kg) || Kazan, Russia || TKO (corner stoppage) || 3 || 3:00
|-
! style=background:white colspan=9 |
|-
|-  style="background:#FFBBBB;"
| 2009-10-16 || Loss ||align=left| Tomáš Hron || Return of the Gladiators || Amsterdam, Netherlands || Decision (unanimous) || 3 || 3:00
|-
! style=background:white colspan=9 |
|-
|-  style="background:#CCFFCC;"
| 2009-09-16 || Win ||align=left| Vladimir Mineev || Tatneft Arena European Cup 2009 1/2 final (+80 kg) || Kazan, Russia || Decision (unanimous) || 4 || 3:00
|-  style="background:#CCFFCC;"
| 2009-05-26 || Win ||align=left| Igor Sen || Tatneft Arena European Cup 2009 1/4 final (+80 kg) || Kazan, Russia || KO (left overhand) || 2 || 1:02
|-  style="background:#CCFFCC;"
| 2009-05-16 || Win ||align=left| Bjorn Bregy || It's Showtime 2009 Amsterdam || Amsterdam, Netherlands || Ext. R Decision (Unanimous)|| 4 || 3:00
|-  style="background:#CCFFCC;"
| 2009-02-19 || Win ||align=left| Andrei Kirsanov || Tatneft Arena European Cup 2009 1/8 final (+80 kg) || Kazan, Russia || TKO (corner stoppage) || 2 || 3:00
|-  style="background:#CCFFCC;"
| 2008-12-20 || Win ||align=left| Shamil Abasov || K-1 Fighting Network Prague 2008 || Prague, Czech Republic || KO (left body shot/right knee) || 2 || 1:34
|-
! style=background:white colspan=9 |
|-
|-  style="background:#CCFFCC;"
| 2008-12-20 || Win ||align=left| Raul Cătinaș || K-1 Fighting Network Prague 2008 || Prague, Czech Republic || Decision (unanimous) || 3 || 3:00
|-  style="background:#CCFFCC;"
| 2008-12-20 || Win ||align=left| Dzevad Poturak || K-1 Fighting Network Prague 2008 || Prague, Czech Republic || TKO (injury) || 3 || 
|-  style="background:#CCFFCC;"
| 2008-10-18 || Win ||align=left| Konstantin Gluhov || Latvijā – "Milžu cīņas", || Liepāja, Latvia || Ext. R Decision || 4 || 3:00
|-  style="background:#FFBBBB;"
| 2008-06-20 || Loss ||align=left| Steve McKinnon || International Muay Thai Fight Night || Montego Bay, Jamaica || Decision (unanimous) || 5 || 3:00
|-
! style=background:white colspan=9 |
|-
|-  style="background:#CCFFCC;"
| 2007-12-24 || Win ||align=left| Tomáš Hron || Return of The King 2 || Paramaribo, Suriname || Decision (unanimous) || 3 || 3:00
|-  style="background:#CCFFCC;"
| 2007-10-14 || Win ||align=left| Henriques Zowa || The Battle of Arnhem 6 || Arnhem, Netherlands || Decision (unanimous) || 3 || 3:00
|-  style="background:#FFBBBB;"
| 2007-05-20 || Loss ||align=left| Nathan Corbett || K-1 Scandinavia GP 2007 || Stockholm, Sweden || Decision (unanimous) || 3 || 3:00
|-
! style=background:white colspan=9 |
|-
|-  style="background:#CCFFCC;"
| 2007-05-20 || Win ||align=left| Rickard Nordstrand || K-1 Scandinavia GP 2007 || Stockholm, Sweden || Decision (unanimous) || 3 || 3:00
|-  style="background:#CCFFCC;"
| 2007-05-20 || Win ||align=left| Damian Garcia || K-1 Scandinavia GP 2007 || Stockholm, Sweden || TKO (low kicks) || 1 || 1:20
|-  style="background:#FFBBBB;"
| 2007-05-04 || Loss ||align=left| Patrice Quarteron || K-1 Fighting Network Romania 2007 || Bucharest, Romania || Decision (unanimous) || 3 || 3:00
|-  style="background:#CCFFCC;"
| 2007-04-07 || Win ||align=left| Samir Benazzouz || Balans Fight Night || Tilburg, Netherlands || Decision || 3 || 3:00
|-  style="background:#CCFFCC;"
| 2006-11-12 || Win ||align=left| Samir Benazzouz || 2H2H: Pride and Honor || Rotterdam, Netherlands || TKO (low kicks) || 3 || 
|-  style="background:#CCFFCC;"
| 2006-05-06 || Win ||align=left| Kenan Akbulut || Masters Fight Night 2006, quarter finals|| Duisburg, Germany || Decision || 3 || 3:00
|-  style="background:#CCFFCC;"
| 2006-02-12 || Win ||align=left| Ricardo van den Bos || Dancing With the Fighters || Amsterdam, Netherlands || Decision || 5 || 3:00
|-  style="background:#FFBBBB;"
| 2005-12-10 || Loss ||align=left| Alexander Ustinov || Fights at the Border IV || Lommel, Belgium || Decision (unanimous) || 3 || 3:00
|-
! style=background:white colspan=9 |
|-
|-  style="background:#CCFFCC;"
| 2005-12-10 || Win ||align=left| Marcin Rozalski || Fights at the Border IV || Lommel, Belgium || Decision (unanimous) || 3 || 3:00
|-  style="background:#CCFFCC;"
| 2005-12-10 || Win ||align=left| Bjorn Bregy || Fights at the Border IV || Lommel, Belgium || Decision (unanimous) || 3 || 3:00
|-  style="background:#CCFFCC;"
| 2005-10-09 || Win ||align=left| Jerrel Venetiaan || Bushido Europe "Rotterdam Rumble" || Rotterdam, Netherlands || Decision (split) || 5 || 3:00
|-  style="background:#CCFFCC;"
| 2005-06-05 || Win ||align=left| Attila Karacs || King of the Ring - Mission Impossible -|| Zagreb, Croatia || Decision (split) || 5 || 3:00
|-
! style=background:white colspan=9 |
|-
|-  style="background:#FFBBBB;"
| 2004-03-27 ||Loss ||align=left| Dmitry Shakuta || WPKL Muay Thai Champions League XII || Rotterdam, Netherlands || Decision (unanimous) || 5 || 3:00
|-
! style=background:white colspan=9 |
|-
|-  style="background:#CCFFCC;"
| 2003-12-05 || Win ||align=left| Magomed Magomedov || King's Birthday 2003, 83 kg tournament || Bangkok, Thailand || Decision (unanimous) || 3 || 3:00
|-  style="background:#CCFFCC;"
| 2003-12-05 || Win ||align=left| Saenkao Kiatyongyut || King's Birthday 2003, 83 kg tournament || Bangkok, Thailand || KO (punches)|| 1 || 1:16
|-  style="background:#CCFFCC;"
| 2003-09-28 || Win ||align=left| Christian di Paolo || WPKL Muay Thai Champions League XI, || Rotterdam, Netherlands || KO (knee to the body) || 3 || 0:34
|-  style="background:#CCFFCC;"
| 2003-04-28 || Win ||align=left| Wanlop Sitpholek || Tulp Promotions || Amsterdam, Netherlands || KO (left uppercut) || 3 || 0:55
|-  style="background:#CCFFCC;"
| 2003-03-22 || Win ||align=left| Kurt de Pauw || Muay Thai Champions League IX || Madrid, Spain || KO (knee) || 1 || 0:45
|-  style="background:#CCFFCC;"
| 2003-02-02 || Win ||align=left| Yücel Fidan || Killerdome II || Amsterdam, Netherlands || KO (flying knee) || 1 || 0:12
|-  style="background:#c5d2ea;"
| 2002-11-29 || NC ||align=left| Rayen Simson || WPKL Muay Thai Champions League VIII|| Rotterdam, Netherlands || No contest (shoulder injury) || 1 || 
|-
! style=background:white colspan=9 |
|-
|-  style="background:#CCFFCC;"
| 2002-10-26 || Win ||align=left| Jiri Zak || WPKL Muay Thai Champions League VII || Madrid, Spain || Decision (unanimous) || 5 || 3:00
|-
! style=background:white colspan=9 |
|-
|-  style="background:#FFBBBB;"
| 2002-03-18 || Loss ||align=left| Rayen Simson || 2Hot2Handle "Simply the Best" 4|| Rotterdam, Netherlands || Decision (unanimous) || 5 || 3:00
|-
! style=background:white colspan=9 |
|-
|-  style="background:#CCFFCC;"
| 2001-10-21 || Win ||align=left| Nordin Ben-Sallah || It's Showtime - Original || Haarlem, Netherlands || TKO (corner stoppage) || 4 || 3:00
|-  style="background:#CCFFCC;"
| 2001-03-03 || Win ||align=left| Changpuek Kiatsongrit || WPKL Muay Thai Champions League IV || Rotterdam, Netherlands || TKO (doctor stoppage) || 3 || 
|-  style="background:#CCFFCC;"
| 2000-11-13 || Win ||align=left| Dennis Strijbis || The Night of Explosion || Rotterdam, Netherlands || TKO (doctor stoppage)|| 1 || 3:00
|-  style="background:#CCFFCC;"
| 2000-06-04 || Win ||align=left| Perry Ubeda || The Night of Revenge || Haarlem, Netherlands || Decision (unanimous) || 5 || 3:00
|-  style="background:#CCFFCC;"
| 2000-01-23 || Win ||align=left| Mark Richardt || Day of No Mercy || Rotterdam, Netherlands || TKO (doctor stoppage) || 2 || 1:00
|-
! style=background:white colspan=9 |
|-
|-  style="background:#FFBBBB;"
| 1999-12-11 || Loss ||align=left| Ron Belliveu || || Sarajevo, Bosnia and Herzegovina || Decision || 5 || 3:00
|-
! style=background:white colspan=9 |
|-
|-  style="background:#CCFFCC;"
| 1999-03-27 || Win ||align=left| Melvin Manhoef || The Fights of the Gladiators || Amsterdam, Netherlands || Decision (unanimous) || 5 || 3:00
|-  style="background:#CCFFCC;"
| 1998-05-31 || Win ||align=left| Feisal Redding || Fights of the Decade || Amsterdam, Netherlands || Decision (unanimous) || 5 || 3:00
|-  style="background:#FFBBBB;"
| 1998-02-15 || Loss ||align=left| Perry Ubeda || Chakuriki vs The Netherlands || Nijmegen, Netherlands || KO (roundhouse kick) || 1 || 
|-  style="background:#CCFFCC;"
| 1997-11-27 || Win ||align=left| Rodney Glunder || Thaiboxing Event in Amsterdam || Amsterdam, Netherlands || Decision (unanimous) || 5 || 3:00
|-
| colspan=9 | Legend:

See also 
List of K-1 Events
List of K-1 champions
List of male kickboxers

References

External links
Official K-1 website

1975 births
Heavyweight kickboxers
Living people
Kunlun Fight kickboxers
People from Marowijne District
Surinamese drug traffickers
Surinamese emigrants to the Netherlands
Surinamese lawyers
Surinamese male kickboxers
Surinamese criminals
Sportspeople from Rotterdam